Dictyomeridium lueckingii is a species of corticolous (bark-dwelling) lichen in the family Trypetheliaceae. Found in Bolivia, it was formally described as a new species in 2016 by Adam Flakus and André Aptroot. It is only known to occur at the type locality, in the Tucumano-Boliviano montane forest. The species epithet honours German lichenologist Robert Lücking, "for his magnificent contribution to the knowledge of tropical lichens, on the occasion of his 50th birthday".

Description

Identifying features of Dictyomeridium lueckingi include an ecorticate and somewhat pruinose thallus, partially-immersed, single, black and white- ascomata with eccentric, beaked ostioles, a distinct , hyaline, amyloid, small somewhat  ascospores, and the occurrence of the lichen product lichexanthone. The latter substance causes the thallus and ascomata surface to fluoresce yellow when lit with a long-wavelength UV light. Its ascospores are somewhat  (divided into  with 5–6 transverse septa and 1–2 longitudinal septa), and measure 25–35 by 12–17 μm. The morphologically similar species D. proponens and D. paraproponens can be distinguished from D. lueckingii by their larger spores.

References

Trypetheliaceae
Lichen species
Lichens described in 2016
Lichens of Bolivia
Taxa named by Adam Grzegorz Flakus
Taxa named by André Aptroot